Swift Creek is an unincorporated community within Pitt County, located south of Greenville along North Carolina Highway 102.

See also 
 Swift Creek Township, Wake County, North Carolina

Populated places in Pitt County, North Carolina